Grandipalpa is a genus of moths in the family Gelechiidae. It contains the species Grandipalpa robusta, which is found in Namibia.

References

Apatetrinae